The bombing of Rome in World War II took place on several occasions in 1943 and 1944, primarily by Allied and to a smaller degree by Axis aircraft, before the city was liberated by the Allies on June 4, 1944. Pope Pius XII was initially unsuccessful in attempting to have Rome declared an open city, through negotiations with U.S. President Franklin D. Roosevelt via Archbishop (later Cardinal) Francis Spellman. Rome was eventually declared an open city on August 14, 1943 (a day after the last Allied bombing raid) by the defending Italian forces.

The first bombing raid occurred on July 19, 1943, when 690 aircraft of the United States Army Air Forces (USAAF) flew over Rome and dropped 9,125 bombs on the city. Though the raid targeted the freight yard and steel factory in the San Lorenzo district of Rome, Allied bombs also struck the district's apartment blocks, damaging the Papal Basilica and killing 1,500 people. Pius XII, who had previously requested Roosevelt not to bomb Rome due to "its value to the whole of humanity", paid a visit to the affected regions of the district; photographs of his visit later became a symbol of anti-war sentiments in Italy. The Allied bombing raids continued throughout 1943 and extended into 1944. In the United States, while the majority of the American media supported the bombing raids, many Catholic newspapers condemned them.

In the 110,000 sorties that comprised the Allied Rome air campaign, 600 aircraft were lost and 3,600 air crew members died; 60,000 tons of bombs were dropped in the 78 days before Rome was captured by the Allies on June 4, 1944.

Correspondences between Pius XII and Roosevelt
Following the first Allied bombing of Rome on May 16, 1943 (three months before the German Army occupied the city), Pius XII wrote Roosevelt asking that Rome "be spared as far as possible further pain and devastation, and their many treasured shrines… from irreparable ruin."

On June 16, 1943, Roosevelt replied:

Bombing of Rome was controversial, and General Henry H. Arnold described Vatican City as a "hot potato" because of the importance of Catholics in the U.S. Armed Forces. British public opinion, however, was more aligned towards the bombing of the city, due to the participation of Italian planes in The Blitz over London. H.G. Wells was a particularly vocal proponent of doing so.

Notable raids

July 19, 1943
On July 19, 1943, during Operation Crosspoint, Rome was bombed again, more heavily, by 521 Allied planes, with three targets, causing thousands of civilian casualties (estimates range between 1,600 and 3,200 victims). After the raid, Pius XII, along with Msgr. Montini (the future Pope Paul VI), travelled to the Basilica of Saint Lawrence outside the Walls, which had been badly damaged, and distributed 2 million lire to the crowds. Between 11 a.m. and 12 noon, 150 Allied B-17 Flying Fortresses attacked the San Lorenzo freight yard and steel factory. In the afternoon, the second target was the "Scalo del Littorio" on the northern side of Rome. The third target was the Ciampino Airport, on south-east side of Rome.

August 13, 1943
Three weeks later, on August 13, 1943, 310 Allied bombers again bombed the city, targeting San Lorenzo and Scalo del Littorio. The surrounding urban districts were also badly hit, and 502 civilians were killed.

September 17, 1943

55 USAAF bombers attacked the Ciampino Airport.

September 18, 1943

Ciampino was attacked again, this time by 35 bombers.

October 23, 1943

73 RAF bombers attacked the Guidonia Air Base.

November 22, 1943

Ciampino was bombed by 39 RAF aircraft.

November 28, 1943

Ciampino was bombed again, by 55 RAF aircraft.

December 28, 1943

Ciampino and Guidonia were bombed by the 12th USAAF.

January 13, 1944

USAAF bombers attacked the Guidonia and Centocelle airfields.

January 19, 1944

147 USAAF bombers attacked the Guidonia and Centocelle airfields, but the surrounding city was also hit.

January 20, 1944

197 USAAF bombers attacked the Guidonia and Centocelle airfields, but the surrounding city was also hit.

March 3, 1944

206 USAAF bombers attacked the Tiburtino, Littorio and Ostiense marshalling yards; these were hit but so were the surrounding urban districts, with 400 civilian deaths.

March 7, 1944

149 USAAF bombers bombed the Littorio and Ostiense marshalling yards, hitting both their objectives and the city.

March 10, 1944

The 12th USAAF bombed the Littorio and Tiburtino marshalling yards, but bombs fell also on the city, killing 200 civilians.

March 14, 1944

112 USAAF bombers attacked the Prenestino marshalling yard; the objective was hit, but the surrounding districts also suffered damage, with 150 civilian casualties.

March 18, 1944

The 12th USAAF bombed Rome, causing 100 civilian casualties. This was the last major air raid over Rome.

Bombing of Vatican City

Vatican City maintained an official policy of neutrality during the war. Both Allied and Axis bombers made some effort not to attack the Vatican when bombing Rome. However, Vatican City was bombed on at least two occasions, once by the British and once by the Germans.

November 5, 1943
On November 5, 1943, a single plane dropped four bombs on the Vatican, destroying a mosaic studio near the Vatican railway station and breaking the windows of the high cupola of St. Peter's, and nearly destroying Vatican Radio. There were no fatalities. Damage from the raid is still visible.

March 1, 1944

There is no obscurity about the identity of the British plane that dropped bombs on the edge of Vatican City on 1 March 1944 as this was explicitly acknowledged, at least in private, by the British Air Ministry as an accidental bombing when one of its aircraft on a bombing raid over Rome dropped its bombs too close to the Vatican wall.

Notes

References

 Döge, F.U. (2004) "Die militärische und innenpolitische Entwicklung in Italien 1943-1944", Chapter 11, in: Pro- und antifaschistischer Neorealismus. PhD Thesis, Free University, Berlin. 960 p. [in German]
 Failmezger, Victor(2020) "Rome: City in Terror". Oxford; Osprey Publishing. 
 Jackson, W.G.F. (1969) The Battle for Rome. London: Batsford. 
 Katz, R. (2003) The Battle for Rome: The Germans, the Allies, the Partisans, and the Pope, September 1943 – June 1944. New York : Simon & Schuster. 
 Kurzman, D. (1975) The Race for Rome. Garden City, New York: Doubleday & Company. 
 Lytton, H.D. (1983) "Bombing Policy in the Rome and Pre-Normandy Invasion Aerial Campaigns of World War II: Bridge-Bombing Strategy Vindicated – and Railyard-Bombing Strategy Invalidated". Military Affairs. 47 (2: April). p. 53–58
 Murphy, P.I. and Arlington, R.R. (1983) La Popessa: The Controversial Biography of Sister Pasqualina, the Most Powerful Woman in Vatican History. New York: Warner Books Inc. 
 Roosevelt, F.D. Pius XII, Pope and Taylor, M.C. (ed.) [1947] (2005) Wartime Correspondence Between President Roosevelt and Pope Pius XII. Whitefish, MT: Kessinger. 
 Trevelyan, R. 1982. Rome '44: The Battle for the Eternal City. New York: Viking.

Further reading
  (Bologna: Il Mulino, 2007)

External links
 Bombing of Rome documents at FDR presidential library
 Collection of documents related to Australian bishops and the bombing of Rome

World War II strategic bombing
Military history of Italy during World War II
1940s in Rome
Pope Pius XII and World War II
1940s in Italy
1943 in Vatican City
1944 in Vatican City
1943 in Italy
1944 in Italy